Hermondale is an unincorporated community in Pemiscot County, in the U.S. state of Missouri.

History
A post office called Hermondale was established in 1919, and remained in operation until 1955. The community was named after Hermon G. Reynolds, the original owner of the town site.

References

Unincorporated communities in Pemiscot County, Missouri
Unincorporated communities in Missouri